Aaron Johnston is an American basketball coach who has been the head women's basketball coach at South Dakota State University since 1999. Johnston has led the Jackrabbits to the NCAA Division II in 2003.

South Dakota State
Aaron Johnston started at South Dakota State working with the men's basketball team as a graduate assistant under then head coach Scott Nagy. He moved to the women's basketball team as an assistant coach under Nancy Neiber. During the 1999-00 season, Neiber took a leave of absence and Johnston took over as interim for the final six games. During those six games, he went on to defeat the #2 ranked and eventual NCAA D-II Runner up; North Dakota State.

Johnston became head coach of the Jackrabbits on June 30, 2000, making him the seventh head coach in SDSU women's basketball era. In three of his first four years as head coach, he led South Dakota State to the Elite 8 three straight years, and won the NCAA D-II national championship over Northern Kentucky 65-50.

Since joining the Summit League in the 2007-08 season the Jackrabbits have made the postseason every year (10 NCAA, 4 WNIT).

He also coached one year for the South Dakota State Jackrabbits men's and women's golf team.

Head coaching record

*Named interim coach for the final six games.

Players drafted into WNBA
 Megan Vogel (2007 WNBA draft) 2nd Round, 19th overall
 Macy Miller (2019 WNBA draft) 3rd Round, 36th overall

References 

Living people
People from Pine Island, Minnesota
American women's basketball coaches
South Dakota State Jackrabbits women's basketball coaches
1974 births